Bishop Kearney may refer to:

People
 James E. Kearney (1884–1977), Roman Catholic Bishop of Salt Lake City and Bishop of Rochester, United States
 John Kearney (bishop) (c.1742–1813), Church of Ireland Bishop of Ossory
 Raymond Augustine Kearney (1902–1956), Roman Catholic Auxiliary Bishop of the Diocese of Brooklyn, United States
 David Kearney (archbishop of Cashel) (died 1624), Irish Roman Catholic prelate

Places
 Bishop Kearney High School (Irondequoit, New York), Roman Catholic secondary school, United States
 Bishop Kearney High School (New York City), Roman Catholic secondary school, United States

See also
 Daniel O'Kearney (died 1778), Roman Catholic Bishop of Limerick, Ireland